Antoine Duranthon (1736 – 20 December 1793) was Minister of Justice in the Government of France from April to July 1792. He was born in Dordogne. He was guillotined during the French Revolution.

1736 births
1793 deaths
French Ministers of Justice
French people executed by guillotine during the French Revolution
People from Dordogne